Uba or Ubah is an Igbo name. The Igbo or Ibo are people from Southeastern Nigeria. Although the pronunciation is the same, the spelling differs by dialect.

Notable people with the name include:
Ifeanyi Ubah (born 3 September, 1971), Nigerian businessman
Emmanuel Nnamdi Uba (born 14 December, 1958), Nigerian politician